Bzowo may refer to the following places:
Bzowo, Greater Poland Voivodeship (west-central Poland)
Bzowo, Kuyavian-Pomeranian Voivodeship (north-central Poland)
Bzowo, Pomeranian Voivodeship (north Poland)